Chavornay is a former commune in the Ain department in eastern France. On 1 January 2019, it was merged into the new commune Arvière-en-Valromey.

Population

See also
Communes of the Ain department

References

Former communes of Ain
Ain communes articles needing translation from French Wikipedia
Populated places disestablished in 2019